Android epistemology is an approach to epistemology considering the space of possible machines and their capacities for knowledge, beliefs, attitudes, desires and for action in accord with their mental states. Thus, android epistemology incorporates artificial intelligence, computational cognitive psychology, computability theory and other related disciplines.

References
Craig, Ian D. 1996. A Review of Android Epistemology Robotika
Ford, K., Glymour, C. and Hayes, P. [eds.] 1995. Android Epistemology, Cambridge: AAAI Press / MIT Press.
Ford, K., Glymour, C. and Hayes, P. [eds.] 2006. Thinking about Android Epistemology, Cambridge: AAAI Press / MIT Press.
Glymour, Clark "Android Epistemology for Babies: Reflections on Words, Thoughts and Theories," Synthese, Vol. 122 (2000), 53–68.
Glymour, Clark, Hayes, P., and Ford, K. "The Pre-History of Android Epistemology," in Ford, K., Glymour, C. and Hayes, P. [eds.] 1995. Android Epistemology, Cambridge: MIT Press.

See also
Artificial Intelligence
Computational epistemology
Formal epistemology
Machine learning
Philosophy of Mind

Epistemology
Android (robot)
Philosophy of artificial intelligence